Rufous short-toed lark may refer to:

 Lesser short-toed lark, a species of lark found in Europe, northern Africa and Asia
 Red-capped lark, a species of lark found in eastern and southern Africa 
 Somali short-toed lark, a species of lark found in eastern and north-eastern Africa